Jules Van Der Flaas (born 7 December 1945) is a Belgian racing cyclist. He rode in the 1969 Tour de France.

References

1945 births
Living people
Belgian male cyclists
Place of birth missing (living people)